Denise C. Nuttall Stephens is an associate professor of astronomy in the College of Physical and Mathematical Sciences in the Department of Physics and Astronomy at Brigham Young University.

Education and research experience 
Stephens graduated from Brigham Young University in 1996 as an undergraduate student with a degree in physics. She received her Master's and Ph.D. in Astronomy from New Mexico State University. She completed her a postgraduate program at the Space Telescope Science Institute and at Johns Hopkins University. She joined the faculty of BYU in 2007. She studies the atmosphere of brown dwarfs, looks for and classifies binary systems, studies TNOs, and uses telescopes both on ground and in space to collect infrared data.

In 2017, she and a team of undergraduates at BYU published their discovery of a new planet called KELT-16b, which was made as part of the KELT project. Her team also co-discovered the hottest known exoplanet KELT-9b the same year.

Community involvement 
Stephens is a coordinator of the BYU Astronomical Society. She also runs an annual public event called Astrofest which introduces physics and astronomy to kids in a fun way. She is the team captain of an on-campus flag football team which is the only women's intramural faculty team at BYU.

Personal life 
Denise Stephens is married and is a mother to seven children.

References 

Living people
Brigham Young University alumni
New Mexico State University alumni
Brigham Young University faculty
Year of birth missing (living people)
American women astronomers
Johns Hopkins University people
Harold B. Lee Library-related 21st century articles